Galgenberg is a German name corresponding to the English "Gallows Hill". Galgenberg may refer to:
 Galgenberg (Elbingerode), a hill near Elbingerode in the Harz Mountains of central Germany
 Galgenberg (Heilbronn), a mountain of Baden-Württemberg, Germany
 Galgenberg (Lütte), a hill in Bad Belzig, Brandenburg, Germany
 Galgenberg (Schwarzenberg), a mountain of Saxony, southeastern Germany
 Galgenberg Formation, a fossiliferous geologic formation in Germany
 Ouvrage Galgenberg, a portion of the Fortified Sector of Thionville of the Maginot Line

See also
 Gallows Hill (disambiguation)
 Venus of Galgenberg, a prehistoric figurine discovered in 1988 near Stratzing, Austria